Richard Louv (born 1949) is an American non-fiction author and journalist. He is best known for his seventh book, Last Child in the Woods: Saving Our Children From Nature-Deficit Disorder (first published in 2005 by Algonquin Books of Chapel Hill), which investigates the relationship of children and the natural world in current and historical contexts. Louv created the term "nature-deficit disorder" to describe possible negative consequences to individual health and the social fabric as children move indoors and away from physical contact with the natural world – particularly unstructured, solitary experience. Louv cites research pointing to attention disorders, obesity, a dampening of creativity and depression as problems associated with a nature-deficient childhood. He amassed information on the subject from practitioners of many disciplines to make his case, and is commonly credited with helping to inspire an international movement to reintroduce children to nature.

Career

Louv was a columnist for The San Diego Union-Tribune newspaper between 1984 and 2007, its last manifestation titled "The Future’s Edge." His essay, on the division of nature and humanity, is renowned for its idealism. He has been a columnist and member of the editorial advisory board for Parents magazine and a Ford Foundation Leadership for a Changing World  award program adviser. He also was an adviser for the National Scientific Council on the Developing Child . He currently is honorary co-chair of The National Forum on Children and Nature , which is co-chaired by four state governors, a visiting scholar at Clemson University, and chairman and co-founder of the Children & Nature Network, a non-profit organization.
In 2008, the National Audubon Society awarded Louv its highest honor, the Audubon Medal. He was the 2007 recipient of Clemson University's Cox Award for "sustained achievement in public service", and received the Paul K. Petzoldt Award from the Wilderness Education Association.
The U.S. Department of the Interior, and associations such as the Sierra Club, The Trust for Public Land, and The Nature Conservancy, have cited Louv's book.

Bibliography

 America II (Penguin, 1983)
 Childhood's Future (Anchor Books, 1993)
 101 Things You Can Do for Our Children's Future (Anchor, 1994)
 Fatherlove (Pocket Books, 1994)
 The Web of Life (Conari Press, 1996)
 Fly-Fishing for Sharks: An American Journey (Simon & Schuster, 2000)
 Last Child in the Woods: Saving Our Children From Nature-Deficit Disorder (Algonquin Books of Chapel Hill, 2005)
 The Nature Principle: Human Restoration and the End of Nature-Deficit Disorder  (Algonquin Books, 2011)
 Vitamin N: The Essential Guide to a Nature-Rich Life  (Algonquin Books, 2016)
 Our Wild Calling: How Connecting with Animals Can Transform Our Lives — and Save Theirs (Workman, 2019)

References

External links
 Richard Louv Official Website
 Today Show. July 16, 2008.
 Morning Edition, National Public Radio. May 25, 2005
 KQED. May 12, 2008
 San Diego Union-Tribune
 Children & Nature Network (C&NN)
 National Scientific Council on the Developing Child
 Public School Insights Interview with Louv. Posted April 22, 2008

Living people
1949 births
American columnists
Biophilia hypothesis